Çilimli District is a district of the Düzce Province of Turkey. Its seat is the town of Çilimli. Its area is 85 km2, and its population is 19,648 (2022).

Composition
There is one municipality in Çilimli District:
 Çilimli

There are 20 villages in Çilimli District:

 Alacamescit
 Bıçkıbaşı
 Çalılık
 Dikmeli
 Döngelli
 Esenli
 Hızardere
 İshaklar
 Kafyayla
 Karaçörtlen
 Kırkharman
 Kiraztarla
 Kuşoğlu
 Pırpır
 Sarımeşe
 Söğütlü
 Tepeköy
 Yeniköy
 Yenivakıf
 Yukarıkaraköy

References

Districts of Düzce Province